Benjamin LaShaun Troupe (born September 1, 1982) is an American former college and professional football player who was a tight end in the National Football League (NFL) for five seasons during the early 2000s.  Troupe played college football for the University of Florida, and earned All-American honors.  He was a second-round pick in the 2004 NFL Draft, and played professionally for the Tennessee Titans and Tampa Bay Buccaneers of the NFL.

Early years 

Troupe was born in Swainsboro, Georgia in 1982.  He attended Butler High School in Augusta, Georgia, where he played high school football for the Butler Bulldogs.  Following his senior season, Troupe was a PrepStar high school All-American and was recognized by the Atlanta Journal-Constitution as one of the top four tight end prospects in the Southeast.

College career 

Troupe accepted an athletic scholarship to attend the University of Florida in Gainesville, Florida, where he played for coach Steve Spurrier and coach Ron Zook's Florida Gators football teams from 2000 to 2003.  He finished his college career with sixty-four receptions for 958 yards (14.9 yards per catch) and seven touchdowns.  As a senior team captain in 2003, Troupe was a first-team All-Southeastern Conference (SEC) selection and received first-team All-American honors from ESPN, Rivals.com and Sports Illustrated.  He was also one of the three finalists for the John Mackey Award, recognizing the nation's best college tight end in 2003.

Professional career 

The Tennessee Titans selected Troupe in the second round with the 40th overall pick of the 2004 NFL Draft. During his four seasons with the Titans, he made 106 receptions for 1,056 yards and seven touchdowns.

Troupe signed with the Tampa Bay Buccaneers on March 6, 2008.  He was released on September 16, after Buccaneers tight end Jerramy Stevens returned from suspension.  Three days after his release from the Buccaneers, Troupe was signed by the Oakland Raiders.  He was placed on injured reserve with a foot injury on October 21, and released by the Raiders on November 17.

Life after football 

Troupe is currently a regular weekly guest on B.J. Bennett's "Afternoon Drive" radio show on Wednesdays between 5:00 and 7:00 p.m.  The show is broadcast on ESPN Radio 103.7 FM – 790 AM from Brunswick, Georgia.

See also 

 2003 College Football All-America Team
 History of the Tennessee Titans
 List of Florida Gators football All-Americans
 List of Florida Gators in the NFL Draft

References

Bibliography 

 Carlson, Norm, University of Florida Football Vault: The History of the Florida Gators, Whitman Publishing, LLC, Atlanta, Georgia (2007).  .

1982 births
Living people
All-American college football players
American football tight ends
Florida Gators football players
Tennessee Titans players
Tampa Bay Buccaneers players
Oakland Raiders players
People from Swainsboro, Georgia
Players of American football from Georgia (U.S. state)